Hurricane Dog was the most intense hurricane in the 1950 Atlantic hurricane season. The fourth named storm of the season, Dog developed on August 30 to the east of Antigua; after passing through the northern Lesser Antilles, it turned to the north and intensified into a Category 4 hurricane. The storm became extratropical on September 12.

Hurricane Dog caused extensive damage to the Leeward Islands, and was considered the most severe hurricane on record in Antigua. Many buildings were destroyed or severely damaged on the island, with thousands left homeless just weeks after Hurricane Baker caused serious damage there. In the United States, the hurricane caused moderate coastal damage, including damage to several boats, and resulted in 11 offshore drownings. Strong winds caused widespread power outages across southeastern New England. There were twelve people missing and assumed dead offshore Nova Scotia. Damage across its path totaled about $3 million (1950 USD, $ 2009 USD).

Meteorological history

The exact origins of Hurricane Dog are obscure, due to sparse ship and land observations over the eastern Atlantic Ocean; the storm may have originated from an easterly wave on August 24 near the Cape Verde islands, but there are no observations to support such development. The storm is first documented as a hurricane with winds of  late on August 30. With high pressures to its northeast, the storm tracked west-northwestward and rapidly intensified: on August 31 it attained major hurricane status, reaching winds of —the first peak intensity in its life—before entering the Leeward Islands. Early on September 1, Hurricane Dog passed just north of Antigua as the equivalent of a Category 4 hurricane on the Saffir-Simpson hurricane wind scale.

Early on September 2, Hurricane Dog came under weak steering currents, causing it to drift northward. The storm mostly maintained its intensity for two more days, but on September 4 it began to re-intensify as it turned northwestward. In 2014, a reanalysis of HURDAT by the Hurricane Research Division found that the peak winds in Hurricane Dog were more likely , marking a reduction in the intensity of Hurricane Dog from Category 5 to Category 4.

Hurricane Dog maintained its peak intensity for about 12 hours. On September 10, Hurricane Dog began turning to the northwest, and a day later it headed north and then northeast. Late that day, it briefly re-intensified slightly to  before transitioning into an extratropical cyclone with hurricane-force winds. The former hurricane passed within  of Cape Cod on September 12. Shortly afterwards, the extratropical remnant turned to the east, losing hurricane winds for several days beginning on September 13. The system eventually turned to the northeast on September 15, and a day later it regained hurricane-force winds as a vigorous extratropical cyclone.

Preparations
In the United States, the threat of the hurricane prompted the National Weather Bureau to issue warnings of gale-force winds, high tides, and rough surf from the Outer Banks of North Carolina to Maine. At least 17 naval ships were moved in preparation for the hurricane. Rhode Island state police officers warned homeowners near the coast to be ready to evacuate, if necessary. There, officials also closed several beaches and canceled ferry travel along the state's southern waterways.
On the day of the hurricane's closest approach to the United States, the National Weather Bureau issued storm warnings from Cape May, New Jersey, to Eastport, Maine.

Impact
On Antigua, where hurricane-force winds were reported for six hours, residents considered it the most severe hurricane in history. Hurricane Dog left thousands homeless on Antigua, just weeks after Hurricane Baker caused severe damage on the island. Damage throughout the Lesser Antilles totaled $1 million (1950 USD, $ 2009 USD), primarily on Antigua and Barbuda, and included many damaged or destroyed homes, ruined crops, blocked roads from washouts or fallen trees, and power outages across the islands. The hurricane resulted in several shipwrecks; two people drowned when their small boat capsized. The hurricane sank a boat on the island of Saint-Barthélemy, where damage amounted to $70,000 (1950 USD, $ 2009 USD).

Heavy rain fell in the Mid-Atlantic States, leading to flash floods in some locations. In Bel Air, Maryland, a car drove into the swollen Little Gunpowder Falls; three people in the car drowned and a fourth was injured. A further two people drowned in Lexington, Virginia. Though newspaper sources attributed the heavy rainfall to Hurricane Dog, this was not confirmed. In Provincetown, a car hit a woman—neither the driver nor the victim was able to see due to the rains. A man in Falmouth was paralyzed from the waist downwards after coming into contact with a wet tree limb next to a downed power line.

The hurricane produced high tides and rough surf along the East Coast of the United States, with coastal flooding reported along some beaches in Rhode Island. The hurricane capsized or damaged several boats along the coastline, including two large vessels in Nantucket. In Marblehead, Massachusetts, the surf grounded at least 15 vessels from the harbor onto a coastal causeway. Near Cape Cod, damage to fishermen's assets totaled $150,000 (1950 USD, $ 2009 USD). Tides along Nantucket were reported at the highest levels since the 1944 Great Atlantic Hurricane. Hurricane Dog produced powerful wind gusts along coastal areas of New England, which caused widespread power outages, including a loss of power to 15 towns on Cape Cod, to hundreds of residences on Nantucket, and to several other locations in the area. Additionally, winds from the hurricane destroyed two small barns and uprooted a few trees, some of which blocked roads. Overall damage was fairly light, totaling about $2 million (1950 USD, $ 2009 USD)—a much lower total than would have been expected if the hurricane had made landfall. In all, 12 people died in New England as a result of the hurricane. Two ships went missing during the storm along the coast of Nova Scotia, with a crew of six people each; their status is unknown, and they are considered storm fatalities.

Records, naming, and aftermath
Before scientific reexamination reduced its winds, Hurricane Dog was listed as the second-strongest Atlantic hurricane on record, tied with Hurricanes Gilbert in 1988 and Wilma in 2005; following reanalysis in 2012, the 1935 Labor Day hurricane also met this distinction. During the 1950, 1951, and 1952 seasons, Atlantic hurricanes were named using the Joint Army/Navy Phonetic Alphabet. However, Hurricane Dog was referred to as "the great hurricane in the central Atlantic" in newspaper reports, and its name was seldom used. Operationally, hurricanes were not referred to by name until 1952.

A relief fund was organized in the aftermath of the hurricane by The Daily Gleaner, a newspaper from Kingston, Jamaica.  The newspaper invited its readers to help assist "their suffering fellow-West Indians in the island of Antigua." Four days after the hurricane, the fund totaled £171,000 (1950 GBP, $ 2009 USD). One Antigua official stated the country "would appreciate voluntary assistance from outside, especially food and clothing". Relief aid was also sent from the United States to the affected islands.

See also

 List of Atlantic hurricanes

References

External links

 1950 Monthly Weather Review

Dog
Dog
1950 natural disasters in the United States
1950 in the Caribbean
1950 meteorology
1950 natural disasters
Dog (1950)
Dog (1950)
Dog (1950)
Dog (1950)
Dog (1950)
Dog (1950)
Dog (1950)
Dog (1950)
Dog (1950)
Dog (1950)
Dog (1950)
Dog (1950)
Dog (1950)
1950 in Saint Kitts-Nevis-Anguilla
History of British Antigua and Barbuda